Isaac Yakovlevich Pavlovsky, a friend of Anton Chekhov, was born in 1853 in the city of Taganrog, studied at Taganrog's Boys Gymnasium, was an activist at the Taganrog revolutionary circle and was arrested and tried at the so-called Trial of the 193. He became a political immigrant in 1878. He made his debut as journalist in Le Temps in 1880 with the story about his imprisonment En Cellule. 

In 1888, Isaac Pavlovsky returned to Russia and worked for the Novoye Vremya, where he published his Paris correspondence. 

Among his publications are: Little people with great sorrow ("Маленькие люди с большим горем", Saint Petersburg, 1889), Sketches of Contemporary Spain ("Очерки современной Испании", Saint Petersburg, 1889), There and Back ("Туда и обратно", Saint Petersburg, 1891), Paris Sketches ("Парижские очерки") and other works.

External links
 
 *Biography

1853 births
1924 deaths
Writers from Taganrog
People from Yekaterinoslav Governorate
Politicians from Taganrog